The Lancastrian and Cumbrian Volunteers was a Territorial Army unit of the British Army.

It was formed on 1 July 1999 following the Strategic Defence Review by the amalgamation of the 4th (Volunteer) Battalion, Queen's Lancashire Regiment and the 4th (Volunteer) Battalion, King's Own Royal Border Regiment. On 1 July 2006, the regiment was re-designated as the 4th Battalion, Duke of Lancaster's Regiment (King's, Lancashire and Border).

History

Initial Structure
This initial structure of the regiment, upon creation, was as follows:
Lancastrian and Cumbrian Volunteers Regimental Headquarters, at Kimberley Barracks, Preston
HQ (Quebec) Company, at Kimberley Barracks, Preston(from HQ Company, 4th Battalion, Queen's Lancashire Regiment)
A (Tobruk) (King's Own Royal Border Regiment) Company, at Barrow-in-Furness and Lancaster(from HQ and C Companies, 4th Battalion, King's Own Royal Border Regiment)
B (Somme) (Queen's Lancashire Regiment) Company, at Preston and Blackpool(from HQ and B Companies, 4th Battalion, Queen's Lancashire Regiment)
C (Sicily) (King's Own Royal Border Regiment) Company, at Workington and Carlisle(from A and D Company, 4th Battalion, King's Own Royal Border Regiment)
D (Waterloo) (Queen's Lancashire Regiment) Company, at Blackburn and Bury(from A and C Companies, 4th Battalion, Queen's Lancashire Regiment)

Prior to re-designation
Three months prior to re-designation as a battalion of the Duke of Lancaster's Regiment, the King's Regiment companies of the King's and Cheshire Regiment were integrated into the structure of the regiment, in order to ease the process of re-designation.
HQ Company, at Kimberley Barracks, Preston
A (King's Regiment) Company, at Liverpool(from A (King's) Company, King's and Cheshire Regiment)
B (Queen's Lancashire Regiment) Company, at Blackburn and Blackpool(from B and D Companies)
C (King's Own Royal Border Regiment) Company, at Workington, Carlisle, and Barrow-in-Furness(from A and C Companies)
D (King's Regiment) Company, at Ardwick Green Barracks, Manchester(from C (King's) Company, King's and Cheshire Regiment)

4th Battalion, Duke of Lancaster's Regiment
In July 2006, as part of Delivering Security in a Changing World, the regiment was transferred to the Duke of Lancaster's Regiment, and designated as the 4th Battalion. It now acts as the reserve infantry battalion for Merseyside, Lancashire, Greater Manchester, and Cumbria, with sub-units dispersed throughout all four counties.

Current Structure
The current battalion structure is as follows:
Battalion Headquarters, at Kimberley Barracks, Preston
Headquarters Company, at Kimberley Barracks, Preston
A (Ladysmith) Company, in Liverpool 
Rifle Platoon, at Peninsula Barracks, Warrington
B (Somme) Company, at Somme Barracks, Blackburn
5 Platoon, at Kimberley Barracks, Preston
Rifle Platoon, at Alexandra Barracks, Lancaster
Mortar Platoon, in Blackpool
C (Kohima) Company, in Workington
8 Platoon, in Carlisle Castle, Carlisle
Assault Pioneer Platoon (Corps of Drums), in Barrow-in-Furness
Detachment, at Alexandra Barracks, Lancaster
D (Inkerman) Company, in Manchester
Machine Gun Platoon (Fusiliers), at Castle Armoury, Bury

References

Infantry regiments of the British Army
Military units and formations established in 1999
1999 establishments in the United Kingdom